The dwarf beaked snake (Dipsina multimaculata), also called the western beaked snake, is a species of snake, which is endemic to southern Africa.   It is in the monotypic genus Dipsina.

Geographic range
It is found in southwestern Botswana, Namibia, and western and central South Africa.

Description
Dipsina multimaculata is a small snake with a distinct, pointed snout.  Adults may attain a total length of 40 cm (15.8 inches), including a 4.5-cm (1.8-in) tail.

It is pale buff or sandy gray dorsally, with three or five series of regular brown spots. The spots in the vertebral series are broader than long. A V-shaped brown mark is found on the back part of the head, with a diagonal brown streak from behind the eye towards the corner of the mouth. Ventrally, it is whitish.

The smooth dorsal scales are arranged in 17 rows. Ventrals number 155–168 in females, the anal plate is divided, and the subcaudals are divided (paired) into 31–40 in females.

References

Psammophiidae
Reptiles described in 1847